G.992.5 (also referred to as ADSL2+, G.dmt.bis+, and G.adslplus) is an ITU-T standard for asymmetric digital subscriber line (ADSL) broadband Internet access. The standard has a maximum theoretical downstream sync speed of 24 megabits per second (Mbit/s). Utilizing G.992.5 Annex M upstream sync speeds of 3.3 Mbit/s can be achieved.

Technical information
ADSL2+ extends the capability of basic ADSL by doubling the number of downstream channels. The data rates can be as high as 24 Mbit/s downstream and up to 1.4 Mbit/s upstream depending on the distance from the DSLAM to the customer's premises.

ADSL2+ is capable of doubling the frequency band of typical ADSL connections from 1.1 MHz to 2.2 MHz. This doubles the downstream data rates of the previous ADSL2 standard (which was up to 12 Mbit/s), and like the previous standards will degrade from its peak bitrate after a certain distance.

ADSL2+ also allows port bonding. This is where multiple ports are physically provisioned to the end user and the total bandwidth is equal to the sum of all provisioned ports. So if 2 lines capable of 24 Mbit/s were bonded the result would be a connection capable of 48 Mbit/s download and twice the original upload speed. Not all DSLAM vendors have implemented this functionality.
ADSL2+ port bonding is also known as G.998.x or G.Bond.

See also
ADSL
List of device bandwidths
VDSL2

References

External links
 ITU-T Recommendation G.992.5: Asymmetric Digital SubscriberLine (ADSL) transceivers – Extended bandwidth ADSL2 (ADSL2+)
 http://homehelphub.com/Tutorials/ADSL

Digital subscriber line
ITU-T recommendations
ITU-T G Series Recommendations
Telecommunications-related introductions in 2009
Telecommunication protocols